Earth (stylized as EARTH) was a Japanese girl group formed by Vision Factory in 2000, with its members consisting of Yuka Togo, Maya Tomonaga, and Sayaka Setoyama. They debuted in February 2000 with the release of the song "Time After Time", and they won the Japan Record Award Newcomer Award and Japan Cable Award Cable Music Award in the same year. They disbanded in January 2005.

History

Togo, Tomonaga, and Setoyama were winners of the Kanagawa & Kyushu Starlight Auditions held in 1999 by Vision Factory. They debuted on February 23, 2000 with the single "Time After Time", which was used as an insert song in the 2000 television drama . By the end of 2000, the group earned the Newcomer Award at the 42nd Japan Record Awards. Earth also won the Cable Music Award at the 33rd Japan Cable Award for "Time After Time." Earth later disbanded in January 2005.

Members

Discography

Studio albums

Singles

Awards

References

External links
 

Avex Group artists
Japanese pop music groups
Musical groups established in 2000
Musical groups disestablished in 2005
Musical groups from Tokyo